In the theory of Probably Approximately Correct Machine Learning, the Natarajan dimension characterizes the complexity of learning a set of functions, generalizing from the Vapnik-Chervonenkis dimension for boolean functions to multi-class functions. Originally introduced as the Generalized Dimension by Natarajan, it was subsequently renamed the Natarajan Dimension by Haussler and Long.

Definition 
Let  be a set of functions from a set  to a set .  shatters a set 
if there exist two functions  such that 
 For every .
 For every , there exists a function  such that
for all  and for all .

It is easy to see that if , the Natarajan dimension collapses to the Vapnik Chervonenkis dimension.  

Shalev-Shwartz and Ben-David  present comprehensive material on multi-class learning and the Natarajan dimension, including uniform convergence and learnability.

References 

Statistical classification
Computational learning theory
Measures of complexity